The First Wike Executive Council was the Executive Council of Rivers State between 5 June 2015 and 24 June 2017. It was led by Governor Ezenwo Nyesom Wike with Ipalibo Banigo as Vice-Chairman. The first set of appointments to the cabinet were made on 5 June 2015. The designees included Kenneth Kobani, Chukwuemeka Woke, Emmanuel C. Aguma, Fred Kpakol, Onimim Jacks, Emmanuel Okah and Opunabo Inko-Tariah. Governor Wike appointed Desmond Akawor, Ambassador to South Korea, to serve as Administrator of the Greater Port Harcourt City Development Authority.

On 16 July 2015, former Permanent Secretary of Rivers State Ministry of Environment Rufus Godwins was sworn in as the Head of Service.

Further appointments to the Wike Executive Council were announced formally on 20 November 2015 and included 20 commissioner nominees, all of whom were confirmed by the Rivers State House of Assembly and sworn in on December 18.

Executive Council members
The Wike Executive Council was composed of the following members:

Resignations, suspensions and dismissals
Media and Publicity Special Adviser, Sir Opunabo Inko-Tariah resigned his cabinet position in a letter of resignation dated 6 November 2015. Inko-Tariah stated that unfolding developments in the state indicated that his services were no longer needed.

On 12 February 2016, Commissioner of Finance, Fred Kpakol along with Accountant General Abere Dagogo were temporarily relieved of their duties. The suspension lasted until 15 February before being lifted following interventions by different political leaders. Governor Ezenwo Nyesom Wike also suspended Kelvin Wachukwu indefinitely from his post as Commissioner of Works. The reasons given included negligence, dereliction of duty and poor project supervision. Wachukwu was replaced by Bathuel Harrison Iheanyichukwu, who was officially sworn into the Cabinet on 9 May.

On 31 August 2016, four commissioners, a special adviser and the Head of Service were handed a suspension of 3
months each for unstated reasons.
The commissioners suspended from office were the Commissioner of Culture and Tourism Tonye Briggs-Oniyide, Commissioner of Finance Fred Kpakol, Commissioner of Sports Boma Iyaye and Commissioner of Chieftaincy and Community Affairs John Bazia. Others suspended included the Head of Service Rufus Godwins and Anugbum Onuoha, Special Adviser on Lands. Further reports, however, revealed that the Governor had taken his decision following an Executive Council meeting in August "which the officials attended late". They were later recalled to their various offices on 16 September that year.

On 15 February 2017, Theophilus Odagme was dismissed from the office of Commissioner of Health.
He was the second commissioner dismissed openly from the cabinet. On 22 June 2017, Wike fired Bathuel Harrison Iheanyichukwu from the post of Commissioner of Works, making him the second cabinet official in that ministry to be removed from office. A day after Harrison's abrupt removal, Commissioner of Information and Communications Austin Tam-George handed in his letter of resignation.

The Executive Council was dissolved on 24 June 2017.

See also
Government of Rivers State
Timeline of the governorship of Ezenwo Nyesom Wike

References

External links

 
2010s establishments in Rivers State
Cabinets established in 2015
State executive councils of Nigeria
2015 politics in Rivers State
2016 politics in Rivers State
executive council of Rivers Stateo
2010s disestablishments in Rivers State
2015 establishments in Nigeria
2017 disestablishments in Nigeria
Cabinets disestablished in 2017